Several Quebec municipalities held elections on November 1, 1987 to elect mayors and councillors.

Results

Gatineau

Source: "Cousineau wins, Luck continues to contest result," Ottawa Citizen, 16 November 1987, C1.

 
1987
1987 elections in Canada
School trustee elections in Quebec